John Wear Burton (2 March 1915 – 23 June 2010) was an Australian public servant, High Commissioner and academic.

Early life
Burton was born in Melbourne, the son of the Rev John Wear Burton, a Methodist Minister. He was educated at Newington College (1924–1932) and went on to graduate from the University of Sydney in 1937.

Public service
In 1937 Burton became a member of the Commonwealth Public Service from where he was granted a Commonwealth scholarship to pursue a doctorate at the London School of Economics. He joined the Department of External Affairs in 1941 and served as private secretary to Herbert Vere Evatt. In 1947, aged 32, he became Secretary of the Department of External Affairs and held that position until June 1950. At the beginning of 1951 he took up the position of Australian High Commissioner to Ceylon, but resigned to return home and contest the Federal election of that year in the electorate of Lowe. As the Australian Labor Party (ALP) candidate he was beaten by William McMahon, a future Prime Minister of Australia.

Academic career
While writing his first book, The Alternative, Burton farmed outside Canberra and in 1960 was awarded a fellowship at the Australian National University. Two years later the Rockefeller Foundation awarded him a grant to study neutralism in Africa and Asia. In 1963, while a Reader in International Relations at University College University of London, he established the Centre for the Analysis of Conflict. He then went on to hold fellowships at numerous universities while living in Canberra.

Espionage
When head of the Department of External Affairs during the time Ian Milner was allegedly passing classified documents to the Soviets. Burton is suspected of providing 'top-cover' for Milner's espionage activities.[Chapple]

Death 
Burton died in a Canberra hospital on 23 June 2010 after suffering a stroke. He was survived by his third wife, Betty, and three children from the prior marriages. Another daughter predeceased him.

Legacy
In introducing Burton as a guest on Radio National, Phillip Adams said; "John Burton was probably the most controversial and visionary public servant of the 20th Century. Branded a pink eminence of the Labor Party by conservative critics, he was clearly one of the most important intellectuals and policy-makers associated with the Curtin Labor Government of the 1940s. As a close associate of 'Doc' Evatt and head of the department of External Affairs (now Foreign Affairs) he did more to shape Australian foreign policy towards Asia and the Pacific than any other person before or since."

Burton's theoretical work on conflict resolution has been highly influential in setting up conflict resolution as an academic discipline in its own right, which is very much needed in the modern globalised world because of the greater potential for disputes between different ethnic and religious communities. In Australia, Burton's work greatly influenced the pioneering course in conflict resolution at Macquarie University, Sydney.

Scholarships, fellowships and grants
 Scholarship - London School of Economics (1941)
 Fellowship - Australian National University (1960)
 Grant - Rockefeller Foundation (1962)
 Fellowship - University of South Carolina (1982)
 Fellowship - University of Maryland (1983)
 Fellowship - George Mason University (1982)

Publications
 "The Alternative" (1954)
 "Labour in transition" (1957)
 "International relations: a general theory" (1965)
 "Controlled communication" (1969)
 "World society" (1972)
 "Internationale politiek" (1974)
 "Deviance, terrorism & war: the process of solving unsolved social and political problems" (1979)
 "Resolving deep-rooted conflict: a handbook" (1987)
 "Conflict resolution as a political system" (1988)
 "On the need for conflict prevention" (1989)
 "Conflict: resolution & provention [The Conflict Series vol 1]" (1990)
 "Conflict: human needs theory [The Conflict Series vol 2]" (1993)
 "Conflict: readings in management and resolution [The Conflict Series vol 3]" (1990)
 "Conflict: practices in management, settlement and resolution [The Conflict Series vol 4]" (1990)
 "Conflict resolution: its language and processes" (1996)

References

Chapple, Angus (30 April 2011). "AUSTRALIA'S COLD WAR: Australia's Kim Philby? The case of Dr John Burton". News Weekly.

Sources

 

1915 births
2010 deaths
Alumni of the London School of Economics
People educated at Newington College
Australian public servants
Public servants from Melbourne
Australian diplomats
Australian non-fiction writers
High Commissioners of Australia to Sri Lanka
20th-century Australian public servants